Victoria Latu (born 22 March 1993) is an Australian rugby league and rugby union footballer who played for the Sydney Roosters in the NRL Women's Premiership.

Playing career

Rugby league
In 2013, Latu represented New South Wales in their 12–30 loss to Queensland.

In 2018, Latu joined the Sydney Roosters NRL Women's Premiership team. In Round 1 of the 2018 NRL Women's season, she made her debut in a 4–10 loss to the New Zealand Warriors. On 30 September 2018, she came off the bench in the Roosters' 12–34 Grand Final loss to the Brisbane Broncos.

Rugby union
In 2016 and 2017, while playing for New South Wales, Latu was named the Player of the Tournament at the Buildcorp National Women's Championships. In 2016, she was named for the Wallaroos for their tour of New Zealand but was ruled out due to injury. In June 2018, she was named in the Wallaroos squad to play England.

Personal life
Latu's uncle, George Latu, playing 10 Tests for Manu Samoa.

References

External links
rugby.com.au profile

1993 births
Living people
Australian sportspeople of Samoan descent
Australian sportspeople of Tongan descent
Australian female rugby league players
Australian female rugby union players
Australia women's international rugby union players
Rugby league props
Sydney Roosters (NRLW) players